Wanda Beach or Wanda  is the northernmost patrolled beach on Bate Bay in Cronulla, New South Wales, Australia. Green Hills or Green Hills Ridge is the name given to the Cronulla sand dunes, just north of Wanda.

History
The original inhabitants of the land were the Gweagal Aborigines who were a clan of the Tharawal (or Dharawal) tribe of Indigenous Australians. They are the traditional custodians of the southern geographic areas of Sydney. Wanda is an Aboriginal word for beach or sand hills.

The Wanda Surf Lifesaving Club was established in 1946 after World War II by a group of men who banded together, as they did in warfare, to patrol the beaches. The colours of Army red, Air Force blue, and Navy blue were adopted as the club colours. The club, located on Marine Esplanade, has grown in size to its current membership of over 900 male and female members, ranging in age from five-year-old Nippers to the original Founding Members. The primary objective of the club is to patrol the beach in an effort to ensure the safety of the surfing public but it is also actively involved in the competition arena, with excellent performances at State and National Competitions. A number of social activities are organised throughout the year to bring together members from all sections of the club.

In 1965 the beach became notorious after the Wanda Beach Murders.

Gallery

References

Geography of Sydney
Kurnell Peninsula
Beaches of New South Wales
Surfing locations in New South Wales
Sutherland Shire